Pratt & Lambert is a brand of architectural and industrial paint founded in 1849. It has been owned by Sherwin-Williams since 1995.

The Pratt & Lambert company started in Buffalo, New York in 1849 as a maker of a drying agent for linseed oil paint. It was listed on the American Stock Exchange in 1905. In 1920, it started manufacturing exterior and interior house paints and varnishes. In 1950, the company began production of latex paints. It merged with United Coatings in August 1994.

The company was purchased by Sherwin-Williams in 1995.

Notes

Paint and coatings companies of the United States
American companies established in 1849
Chemical companies established in 1849
Manufacturing companies based in Buffalo, New York
Companies formerly listed on NYSE American
1849 establishments in New York (state)
Defunct manufacturing companies based in New York (state)
Defunct companies based in Buffalo, New York
American companies disestablished in 1995